John Raglan Glascock (August 25, 1845 – November 10, 1913) was an American lawyer and politician who served one term as a U.S. Representative from California from 1883 to 1885.

Biography 
Born in Panola County, Mississippi, Glascock moved to California in 1856 with his parents, who settled in San Francisco. He attended the public schools and graduated from the University of California at Berkeley in 1865. He studied law at the University of Virginia at Charlottesville. He was admitted to the bar by the supreme court of California in 1868 and commenced practice in Oakland, California. He was admitted to practice before the Supreme Court of the United States in 1882. He served as district attorney of Alameda County, California from 1875 to 1877.

Congress
Glascock was elected as a Democrat to the Forty-eighth Congress (March 4, 1883 – March 3, 1885). He was an unsuccessful candidate for reelection in 1884 to the Forty-ninth Congress. He served as mayor of Oakland, California from 1887 to 1890.

Later career and death 
He resumed the practice of law in Oakland. He died at his country home in Woodside, California, November 10, 1913.
He was interred in Mountain View Cemetery, Oakland, California.

References

1845 births
1913 deaths
Democratic Party members of the United States House of Representatives from California
Mayors of Oakland, California
19th-century American politicians
People from Woodside, California